The 1911 Boston Red Sox season was the 11th season in the franchise's Major League Baseball history. The Red Sox finished fourth in the American League (AL) with a record of 78 wins and 75 losses, 24 games behind the Philadelphia Athletics, who went on to win the 1911 World Series. This was the final season that the Red Sox played their home games at Huntington Avenue Grounds, before moving to Fenway Park.

Regular season 

Prior to the regular season, the team held spring training in Redondo Beach, California.
 April 12: The regular season opens with an 8–5 loss to the Washington Senators at Griffith Stadium in Washington, D.C.
 April 21: The team wins its home opener against the Philadelphia Athletics, 13–4.
 August 5: The team releases Red Kleinow.
 September 9: The team's longest losing streak of the season, seven games, ends with a road win over Philadelphia.
 October 7: The regular season ends with an 8–1 home win over Washington; it is the team's sixth consecutive victory, their longest winning streak of the season.
The team's longest games of the season were 12 innings; a May 19 road win at Chicago, and an August 3 home win against Detroit.

Statistical leaders
The offense was led by center fielder Tris Speaker, who had eight home runs, 70 RBIs, and a .334 batting average. Boston's two regular corner outfielders, Duffy Lewis and Harry Hooper, hit .307 and .311, respectively. Collectively, they were known as the Golden Outfield. The pitching staff was led by Smoky Joe Wood with a 23–17 record, 2.02 ERA, and 231 strikeouts.

Season standings 

The team played no games that ended in a tie, for the first time in franchise history.

Record vs. opponents

Opening Day lineup 

Source:

Roster

Player stats

Batting

Starters by position 
Note: Pos = Position; G = Games played; AB = At bats; H = Hits; Avg. = Batting average; HR = Home runs; RBI = Runs batted in

Other batters 
Note: G = Games played; AB = At bats; H = Hits; Avg = Batting average; HR = Home runs; RBI = Runs batted in

Pitching

Starting pitchers 
Note: G = Games pitched; IP = Innings pitched; W = Wins; L = Losses; ERA = Earned run average; SO = Strikeouts

Other pitchers 
Note: G = Games pitched; IP = Innings pitched; W = Wins; L = Losses; ERA = Earned run average; SO = Strikeouts

References

Further reading

External links
1911 Boston Red Sox team page at Baseball Reference
1911 Boston Red Sox season at baseball-almanac.com

Boston Red Sox seasons
Boston Red Sox
Boston Red Sox
1910s in Boston